Holm & Co were ship owners, ship brokers and stevedores based in Wellington, New Zealand. They were agents for Australian and other foreign airways and shipping lines.

The business was founded by Swedish-born Captain Pehr Ferdinand Holm (1844—1917) when he bought the barque Genevie M Tucker in 1889. He had settled in Wellington in 1868. His last sailing ship was the barquentine Titania wrecked off Nouméa in 1914 when the lighthouse was under a wartime blackout. Two sons became marine engineers and two became master mariners. Sydney Holm ran the business before his father died and thereafter. A company was incorporated to take ownership of the business in 1918 with offices in the Huddart Parker Line building in Wellington's Post Office Square.

The Union Steam Ship Company took a controlling shareholding in 1930.

In 1968 Richardson & Co and Canterbury Steam Ship Company joined Holm & Co and the three businesses became subsidiaries of Union Steam.

Shipping services were provided to:
 New Zealand's coast extending to the Chatham Islands, Norfolk Island, Raoul Island, Campbell Island.
 Australia (timber trade only), Japan, and passengers from Australia via Italy to England.
 Refrigerated cargo to Honolulu and the Pacific coast of North America.

Holm & Co's ships included:
Genevie M. Tucker
Helen Denny
John
Titania
Progress
Holmdale (Kylebeg)
Holmwood (Forest Home)
Holmglen (previously Argus)
Holmlea (Parera) chartered 1934, bought 1935, renamed 1936 - 555grt triple-expansion steamer, built 1921 by Goole Shipbuliding, sold 1949
Holmlea (Seaway Princess) bought 1969 from Northern Steamship, renamed 1970 - 1,053 grt, stern door roll-on/roll-off, built 1967 by Hong Kong & Whampoa Dock Co, sold 1975
Holmburn (Port Whangarei)
Holmwood (Tees)
Port Waikato
Holmwood
Holmglen
Holmburn
Holmdale
Holmbank (previously Anne)
Holmbrae (previously)
Holmpark (previously)
Gael
Wakanui
Marlyn
Picton (previously Koau)
Parer

References

Shipping companies of New Zealand
Transport companies established in 1889
New Zealand companies established in 1889